Pandemonium is the fourth studio album by American band The Time released in 1990. Much like the three previous albums, the album consists of music in the funk rock genre, although this album breaks the Time's six-song album tradition. The album is a tie-in with the film Graffiti Bridge, and several songs from the album appear in the film.

According to biographer Matt Thorne, Prince co-wrote "Donald Trump (Black Version)". The album was certified Gold by the RIAA and "Jerk Out" became one of the band's biggest singles. The second single, "Chocolate" didn't fare as well.

Critical reception
"The songs' obsessions with sex, food and time scream 'concept'," remarked Michele Kirsch in a 4 out of 5 review for Select, "but only in a fun, sexy, blaxploitation movie soundtrack kind of way. Lots of background jive talk, chat up lines and bogus off-tape comments make you feel like you're gatecrashing a party at the point where everybody pairs off to go to his or her place… Bastard sons of George Clinton, take a bow."

Track listing

Singles
"Jerk Out" (#1 R&B, #9 Pop)
"Jerk Out"
"Mo' Jerk Out" – 7" single
"Get It Up" – 12" single
"Jerk Out" (Sexy Mix) – 12" single
"Jerk Out" (Sexy Edit) – 12" single
"Jerk Out" (A Capella) – 12" single
"Jerk Out" (Sexy Dub) – 12" single
"Jerk Out" (Sexy Instrumental) – 12" single
"Chocolate" (#44 R&B)
"Chocolate"
"My Drawers"
"Chocolate" (12 Inch Remix) – 12" single
"Chocolate" (Tootsie Roll Club Mix) – 12" single
"Chocolate" (Instrumental) – 12" single
"Chocolate" (Percapella) – 12" single

Personnel
Morris Day – Lead vocals
Jellybean Johnson, Jerome Benton, Jesse Johnson, Jill Jones, Jimmy Jam, Karyn White, Margie Cox, Monte Moir, Terry Lewis – Background vocals
Terry Lewis – Bass
Jellybean Johnson – Drums
Jerome Benton – Percussion
Jesse Johnson – Guitar
Jimmy Jam – Keyboards
Candy Dulfer – Saxophone
Monte Moir – Keyboards
Steve Hodge – Engineer
Benny Medina – Executive producer
Femi Jiya – Engineer
Brian Gardner – Mastering
Tom Garneau – Engineer
The Time – Producer, Arranger, Written – The Time

Charts

Weekly charts

Year-end charts

Certifications

References

External links
 Pandemonium lyrics

1990 albums
Albums produced by Prince (musician)
Funk rock albums
Paisley Park Records albums
The Time (band) albums